In political philosophy, limited government is the concept of a government limited in power. It is a key concept in the history of liberalism.

Relationship to Constitutions
Limited government is closely associated with constitutions; the United States Constitution of 1789 and the French Constitution of 1793 were both enacted in an effort to reaffirm limited government, although in different ways. The U.S. Constitution achieved limited government through a separation of powers: "horizontal" separation of powers distributed power among branches of government (the legislature, the executive, and the judiciary, each of which provide a check on the powers of the other); "vertical" separation of powers (federalism) divided power between the federal government and the state government. James Madison, one of the authors of the Federalist Papers, noted that the Framers of the American Constitution sought to create a government that was capable of both being controlled and of exercising control. Madison wrote in Federalist No. 51 that "the great security against a gradual concentration of the several powers in the same department, consists in giving to those who administer each department, the necessary constitutional means, and personal motives, to resist encroachments of the others."

The 1793 French Constitution, on the other hand, cherished legislative supremacy and was based on the idea (influenced by Rousseau), that limited government was best achieved through a "rational democratic self-government seeking to give expression to the general will ... as the optimal antidote to the arbitrary rule of absolute monarchy."

History
Magna Carta and the U.S. Constitution also represent important milestones in the limiting of governmental power. The earliest use of the term limited government dates back to King James VI and I in the late 16th century. Scholar Steven Skultety argues that although Aristotle never developed principles and tactics of constitutionalism, Aristotle's political philosophy in some ways anticipated the idea of limited government, primarily as a tool for limiting civic distrust and enhancing stability.

John Locke, a liberal philosopher, was an important theorist of liberal government. Writing in his Two Treatises of Government, Locke reasoned that men living in a state of nature would voluntarily join in a social contract, forming a "commonwealth" or government. Locke further reasoned that the powers of the government had to be restricted to only what the people allowed it to do. He cites four specific limitations on government power. Locke's first limitation specified that governments could only govern according to promulgated established laws, and that all people were equal under the law, regardless of their material or social status, and Locke's second limitation held that laws could only be designed in the name of the common good  (2nd Tr., § 136). His third limitation repeated the principle of no taxation without representation, arguing that, "[governments] must not raise taxes on the property of the people, without the consent of the people, given by themselves, or their deputies" (2nd Tr., § 142). Finally, Locke argued in his fourth limitation that the legislature could not delegate law-making authority to any other power without the people's consent (2nd Tr., § 141).

When limited government is put into practice it often involves the protection of individual liberty from government intrusion.

Scholar Jennifer Nedelsky argues that the American conception of limited government changed during the period 1787 and 1830 and was based on a number of different strains of thought, but was primarily based on the Federalist perspective, which emphasized private property.

According to The World Justice Project Rule of Law Index which measures adherence to the rule of law in 140 countries and jurisdictions around the globe, checks on government powers eroded in 58% of countries measured from 2021 to 2022.

Issues
Amy Gutmann notes that negative liberalism, positive liberalism, and democratic liberalism all advance different conceptions of the proper limits to government. Gutmann connects the first two categories to Isaiah Berlin's notions of negative liberty and positive liberty, respectively. Gutmann defends the third category, democratic liberalism, writing that under this view, "a liberal government should be no more nor less limited than is needed, first, to secure basic liberties and opportunities for all individuals, and second to respect the outcomes of fair democratic procedures as long as they are consistent to the constitutional constraints of securing basic liberties and opportunities for all."

See also 
 Constitutionalism
 Enumerated powers
 Natural and legal rights
 Social contract

References

Further reading
 

Classical liberalism
Liberalism
Minarchism
Paleoconservatism
Paleolibertarianism
Political philosophy